Centropages elegans is a marine species of copepods in the genus Centropages.

References

External links 

Centropagidae
Crustaceans described in 1895